Henry Sherringham was a former Australian professional soccer player who played as a forward and played for the Australia.

International career
Sherringham began his international career with Australia in an inside-left position against Canada in a 3–2 win on 7 June 1924. He played his second and last international match against in a 0–1 loss to Canada.

Career statistics

International

References

Australian soccer players
Association football forwards
Australia international soccer players